The Montville Schoolhouse is a historic one-room schoolhouse located at 6 Taylortown Road in the township of Montville in Morris County, New Jersey. The red brick schoolhouse was built in 1871 and added to the National Register of Historic Places on December 11, 2009, for its significance in education and politics/government. Since 1963, it has been the home of the Montville Township Historical Society and Museum.

See also
 National Register of Historic Places listings in Morris County, New Jersey
 List of museums in New Jersey

References

Montville, New Jersey
Schools in Morris County, New Jersey
One-room schoolhouses in New Jersey
National Register of Historic Places in Morris County, New Jersey
School buildings on the National Register of Historic Places in New Jersey
School buildings completed in 1871
Brick buildings and structures
1871 establishments in New Jersey
New Jersey Register of Historic Places
Museums in Morris County, New Jersey
History museums in New Jersey
Museums established in 1963